The First 48: Missing Persons is an American documentary television series on A&E that debuted on June 2, 2011 and ended on February 7, 2013.

Premise
The series name comes from the statistic that the odds of solving a case decrease by 50% if a solid lead is not found within the first 48 hours after the person has gone missing. Filmed in Chicago, the series gives an inside look at the real-life cases and procedures of the Chicago Missing Persons Unit. Similar to its predecessor series, The First 48, each episode usually focuses on two cases, beginning with the report of a missing person and ending with either a resolution or the point when the case reaches an extended dead end.

Episodes

Season 1: 2011

Season 2: 2012-2013

References

External links
 

2010s American documentary television series
2011 American television series debuts
2013 American television series endings
American television spin-offs
English-language television shows
A&E (TV network) original programming
Chicago Police Department
Television shows set in Chicago
Television series about missing people